Ideonella paludis is a Gram-negative, strictly aerobic and motile bacterium from the genus of Ideonella which has been isolated from water from the Banping Lake in Taiwan.

References

External links
Type strain of Ideonella paludis at BacDive -  the Bacterial Diversity Metadatabase

Comamonadaceae
Bacteria described in 2016